The following is an alphabetical list of members of the United States House of Representatives from the state of Minnesota.  For chronological tables of members of both houses of the United States Congress from the state (through the present day), see United States congressional delegations from Minnesota.

Current members 
Updated August 2022.

 : Brad Finstad (R) (since 2022) 
 : Angie Craig (D) (since 2019)
 : Dean Phillips (D) (since 2019)
 : Betty McCollum (D) (since 2001)
 : Ilhan Omar (D) (since 2019)
 : Tom Emmer (R) (since 2015)
 : Michelle Fischbach (R) (since 2021)
 : Pete Stauber (R) (since 2019)

List of representatives

See also

List of United States senators from Minnesota
United States congressional delegations from Minnesota
Minnesota's congressional districts

References 

Minnesota
United States representatives
United States representatives